Stomopneustidae is a family of echinoderms belonging to the order Stomopneustoida.

Genera:
 Parastomechinus Philip, 1963
 Phymechinus Desor, 1856
 Phymotaxis Lambert & Thiéry, 1914
 Promechinus Vadet, Nicolleau & Reboul, 2010
 Stomopneustes L.Agassiz, 1841
 Triadechinus H.L.Clark, 1927

References

Stomopneustoida
Echinoderm families